"Predictable" is a song written by Delta Goodrem, Kara DioGuardi, and Jarrad Rogers for Goodrem's debut studio album, Innocent Eyes (2003). Released on 1 December 2003, the single peaked at number-one on the Australian ARIA Singles Chart, becoming Goodrem's fifth consecutive number-one single in Australia. This achievement broke the record set by Goodrem for the most consecutive number-ones from a debut album; the original record was held by Kylie Minogue. Due to Goodrem's cancer treatment, she was unable to shoot an accompanying film clip; Sony used a live video to represent the song. The live video was shot at the headquarters for Channel V in July 2003.

Background and meaning
The song was produced by John Fields in Los Angeles. Originally, the demo version of the song was rather different from the end product; however, Delta Goodrem desired the song to have a rock edge to it, thus asking Fields to help produce it.  The song is set around the theme of a girl rejecting the advances of a man, because she can see through his façade, and knows that if she lets him enter her life, she will end up heartbroken.

Release and reception
Epic Records chose "Predictable" as the last single to represent Innocent Eyes and released it as a CD single on 1 December 2003. The single was released with three different, collectable picture discs and debuted at number two on the Australian ARIA Singles Chart, behind the first-series Australian Idol winner, Guy Sebastian. Due to her illness and treatment, the single received little promotion, but two weeks after its release, the song reached number one. The single remained in the top 10 for eight weeks and became the 17th-highest-selling single of Australia for 2003.

Track listing

Credits and personnel
Credits are lifted from the Innocent Eyes album booklet.

Studios
 Produced, recorded, and arranged at Mansfield Lodge, Conway (Los Angeles), and Metropolis Audio (Melbourne, Australia)
 Mastered at Sterling Sound (New York City)

Personnel

 Delta Goodrem – writing, piano
 Kara DioGuardi – writing
 Jarrad Rogers – writing
 John Fields – vocals, guitars, bass, keyboards, production, recording, arrangement
 Phil Solem – guitars
 David Falzone – piano
 Matt Mahaffey – keyboards, noises
 Dorian Crozier – drums
 Billy Hawn – percussion
 Ameena Khawaja – cello
 Sam Storey – studio assistant (Conway)
 Robbie Adams – studio assistant (Metropolis)
 Carl Schubert – studio assistant (Metropolis)
 Michael H. Brauer – mixing
 Greg Calbi – mastering

Charts

Weekly charts

Year-end charts

Decade-end charts

Certifications and sales

References

External links
 Song lyrics

2003 singles
2003 songs
Delta Goodrem songs
Number-one singles in Australia
Song recordings produced by John Fields (record producer)
Songs written by Delta Goodrem
Songs written by Jarrad Rogers
Songs written by Kara DioGuardi